Ron Tompkins may refer to: 

 Ron Tompkins (baseball), American baseball player
 Ronald G. Tompkins, American doctor